Artyom Sergeyevich Yuran (born 24 June 1997) is a Russian football player who plays for FC Khimki.

Club career
He made his debut in the Russian Premier League for FC Khimki on 9 April 2022 in a game against PFC CSKA Moscow.

Personal life
He is a son of Sergei Yuran.

Career statistics

References

External links
 
 
 

1997 births
Footballers from Düsseldorf
Living people
Russian footballers
Association football defenders
FC Baltika Kaliningrad players
FC Khimki players
FC Rotor Volgograd players
Russian Second League players
Russian Premier League players
Russian expatriate footballers
Expatriate footballers in Latvia
Russian expatriate sportspeople in Latvia